The Battle of Famagusta was a military engagement during the Cyprus Emergency. It involved a battle between British troops and members of EOKA.

References

Famagusta
Cyprus Emergency
1955 in Cyprus
November 1955 events in Europe